Ulet Rajin Kreatif Anti Narkoba Football Club (simply known as Urakan FC) is an Indonesian football club based in East Jakarta, Jakarta. They currently competes in Liga 3.

Honours 
 ISC Liga Nusantara Jakarta
 Winners (1): 2016

References

External links

East Jakarta
Sport in Jakarta
Football clubs in Indonesia
Football clubs in Jakarta
Association football clubs established in 1986
1986 establishments in Indonesia